Jykine Bradley (born June 5, 1980) is a former professional gridiron football defensive back and who is currently serving as the defensive backs coach for the Ottawa Redblacks of the Canadian Football League (CFL). He played college football for the Middle Tennessee State Blue Raiders.

Professional career 
In his playing career Bradley was signed by the Roanoke Steam as a street free agent in 2003. Bradley also played for the Buffalo Bills, Hamilton Tiger-Cats, and Edmonton Eskimos.

Coaching career 
In 2022 Bradley was defensive backs coach for the Hamilton Tiger-Cats. On February 21, 2023 the Ottawa Redblacks announced they had hired Bradley as the teams defensive backs coach.

Personal life
Bradley lives in Brantford, Ontario and runs his own football camp called Bradley’s Sports Performance (BDP). He also helps coach for the Brantford Bisons.

References

External links
Hamilton Tiger-Cats bio
Middle Tennessee State Blue Raiders bio

1980 births
Living people
American football defensive backs
Buffalo Bills players
Canadian football defensive backs
African-American players of American football
African-American players of Canadian football
Edmonton Elks players
Hamilton Tiger-Cats players
Middle Tennessee Blue Raiders football players
Players of American football from Tennessee
Sportspeople from Knoxville, Tennessee
21st-century African-American sportspeople
20th-century African-American people
Players of American football from Knoxville, Tennessee